Sally Roberts may refer to:

Sally Roberts Jones (born 1935), née Sally Roberts, writer
Sally-Ann Roberts, newscaster
Sally Roberts (wrestler) (born 1980), American wrestler